Pillars of Society is a 1920 British silent drama film directed by Rex Wilson and starring Ellen Terry, Norman McKinnel and Mary Rorke. It was based on the 1877 play The Pillars of Society by Henrik Ibsen. Location shooting was done in Norway.

Plot
In Norway a shipping magnate frames his absent brother-in-law for theft and betrayal of his mistress.

Cast
 Ellen Terry - Widow Bernick
 Norman McKinnel - John Halligan
 Mary Rorke - Mrs. Halligan
 Joan Lockton - Diana Dorf
 Irene Rooke - Martha Karsten
 Lydia Hayward - Lena Hessel
 Charles Ashton - Dick Alward
 John Kelt - Parson Rogers
 Pamela Neville - Florence
 Lovat Cave-Chinn - Olaf Hessel

References

External links

1920 films
1920 drama films
Films based on works by Henrik Ibsen
Films directed by Rex Wilson
British films based on plays
British drama films
British silent feature films
British black-and-white films
1920s English-language films
1920s British films
Silent drama films